Manuel Benthin (born 3 March 1979) is a German former professional footballer who played as a defender.

Career 
Benthin was born in Berlin-Marzahn, East Germany. He was somewhat of a journeyman when it comes to the football clubs he has played for over the years. Since turning professional in the late 1990s, Benthin has signed for ten different German teams. The defender has played 17 games in the 2. Bundesliga for Tennis Borussia Berlin, 1. FC Union Berlin and Alemannia Aachen.

References

External links 
 
 Profile at FuPa.net
 

1979 births
Living people
Footballers from Berlin
German footballers
Germany under-21 international footballers
Association football defenders
2. Bundesliga players
Füchse Berlin Reinickendorf players
Hamburger SV II players
Tennis Borussia Berlin players
1. FC Union Berlin players
Alemannia Aachen players
FC Erzgebirge Aue players
SV Babelsberg 03 players
Berliner FC Dynamo players